is a Japanese surname. It may refer to

People
, a Japanese professional baseball player for the Yomiuri Giants (1962–1971) and Chiba Lotte Marines (1974)
, a Japanese composer, pianist, conductor, and singer
, a former member of the Japanese pop music group Onyanko Club

Fictional people
 of Ouran High School Host Club
 (Joey Wheeler) of Yu-Gi-Oh! 
 Sai Jounouchi of Angelic Layer